The 1990 Harvard Crimson football team was an American football team that represented Harvard University during the 1990 NCAA Division I-AA football season. The Crimson tied for fourth in the Ivy League.

In their 20th year under head coach Joe Restic, the Crimson compiled a 5–5 record and were outscored 206 to 199. Tom Callahan was the team captain.

Harvard's 3–4 conference record tied for fourth in the Ivy League standings. The Crimson were outscored 158 to 140 by Ivy opponents. 

Harvard played its home games at Harvard Stadium in the Allston neighborhood of Boston, Massachusetts.

Schedule

References

Harvard
Harvard Crimson football seasons
Harvard Crimson football
Harvard Crimson football